Grote is a surname.

Grote may also refer to:

Given name
 Grote Stirling (1875–1953), Canadian politician
 Grote Reber (1911–2002), American radio astronomer

Other 
 6886 Grote, an asteroid named for Grote Reber
 Grote Kerk, Haarlem, a church in the Netherlands
 Grote Knip, a beach on Curaçao

See also 
 Grote & Weigel, American meat company
 Groat (disambiguation)